Karl Boyes (born 4 November 1982) is an English professional pool player. He won the 2010 world 8-ball championships. In the final, Boyes had the much better start and led Niels Feijen 4-0 and 11–5, before his opponent started a catch-up and levelled at 12-12. Boyes won the final rack, winning 13–12.

Boyes has been a part of four Mosconi Cup teams, competing for Europe in 2010, 2013, 2014 and 2015. In all of these seasons, Europe would defeat the USA.

Personal life
Boyes was born in Bradford, West Yorkshire. He began playing pool, mainly English 8-ball, as a teenager in pubs in Manchester.

In November 2020, Boyes started a self-named YouTube channel. On the channel, he uploads pool tutorial videos as well as lessons and tips.

Career achievements
 2015 Mosconi Cup
 2014 World Cup of Pool - with (Darren Appleton)
 2014 Mosconi Cup
 2013 Southern Classic Bigfoot 10-Ball Challenge
 2010 Mosconi Cup
 2012 Guinness Speed Pool Championship
 2010 WPA World Eight-ball Championship
 2010 WPA World Team Championship
 2010 Euro Tour Austria Open
 2010 Mosconi Cup

References

External links
 Karl Boyes on AZ Billiards

Living people
1982 births
English pool players
Place of birth missing (living people)
WPA World Eight-ball Champions